LeSean is a given name. Notable people with the name include:

LeSean McCoy (born 1988), American football player
LeSean Thomas (born 1975), American animation producer, director, and writer

See also
La'Sean
LaShawn
LeShon

Masculine given names